The 1936 DePaul Blue Demons football team was an American football team that represented DePaul University as an independent during the 1936 college football season. The team compiled a 7–2 record and outscored all opponents by a total of 149 to 59. The team played its home games at Wrigley Field in Chicago. Jim Kelly was the head coach.

Schedule

References

DePaul
DePaul Blue Demons football seasons
DePaul Blue Demons football